This is a list of statues of King George V of the United Kingdom and aboard.

See also 
 List of statues of Queen Victoria
 List of statues of British royalty in London
 Royal monuments in the United Kingdom

References 

George V
George V